Florentius of Sardis was a 5th century bishop of Sardis and theologian.

He was also an attendee to the Council of Chalcedon fl 451. where he noted himself by giving impromptu translations of Latin text for his Greek speaking colleagues. and at one heated point in the Council, he called for an adjournment.
He was also one of 22 delegates who formed a subcommittee of the Council, to examine and formulate the statement for the  general Synod.

He was  the recipient of a letter  from Theodoret, who urged  Florentius to oppose heresy and support  those who are being persecuted.

References

Year of birth unknown
Church Fathers
Bishops of Sardis
5th-century Byzantine bishops